Aber Village or Aber Clydach is a hamlet within the Brecon Beacons National Park in Powys, Wales. It is centred on the minor road which runs south from Talybont-on-Usk up the Caerfanell valley known as Glyn Collwn across the Brecon Beacons to Pontsticill and Merthyr Tydfil. Aber Clydach lies within the community of Talybont-on-Usk about 1.5 km to the south of the village of Talybont and 0.5 km to the north of the dam of Talybont Reservoir.

Both the Usk Valley Walk and the Taff Trail pass close to the village. The Danywenallt Study Centre administered by the Brecon Beacons National Park Authority in association with the Youth Hostels Association lies across the valley from the village.

Notable residents
 Alice Matilda Langland Williams (1867–1950), Welsh writer
 William Retlaw Williams (1863–1944), Welsh writer

References

Brecon Beacons
Villages in Powys